is a closed railway station in Asakita-ku, Hiroshima, Japan, formerly operated by West Japan Railway Company (JR West) on the Kabe Line. It closed on 1 December 2003 when operation of the line was suspended between Kabe Station and Sandankyō Station.

Lines
Kōdo Station was located on the Kabe Line, and was situated between the current location of Kōdo-Homachigawa Station and Aki-Kameyama Station.

Station layout
Kōdo Station had one side platform serving the single-track line.

History
Kōdo Station opened on 20 December 1956, operated by Japanese National Railways (JNR). It became a JR West station on 1 April 1987 following the privatization of JNR.

The station closed on 1 December 2003 along with the rest of the non-electrified section of the Kabe Line.

During the Kabe Line extension towards Aki-Kameyama, the station was demolished.

Surrounding area

Kōdo Station was located to the west of the central part of the Kabe residential areas. The station was surrounded by densely packed houses, and found at the end of a now little used alley. The Ōta River is located several hundred meters to the south of the station.

 Kabe Yokkaichi Contract Branch Post Office
 Kabe Kindergarten
 Tomotetsu Industries headquarters
 Hiroshima Municipal Kameyama-Minami Elementary School
 Hiroshima Municipal Kameyama-Minami Junior High School

Highway access
 National Route 54
 Hiroshima Prefectural Route 177 (Shimosa Higashi Route)
 Hiroshima Prefectural Route 267 (Utsu-Kabe Route)

References

Railway stations in Hiroshima Prefecture
Railway stations in Japan opened in 1956
Kabe Line suspended stations
Stations of West Japan Railway Company in Hiroshima city
Railway stations closed in 2003